His Highness Prince Suphayok Kasem (พระวรวงศ์เธอ พระองค์เจ้าศุภโยคเกษม) (29 August 1872 – 1932), formerly known as: Mom Chao Nen Kashemsri (หม่อมเจ้าเณร เกษมศรี), was a son of Prince Kashemsri Subhayok and Mom Poem Kashemsri na Ayudhya, and a former Thai Minister of Finance.

Prince Suphayok-Kasem, formerly known as Mom Chao Naen Kashemsri, was born on 29 August 1872 and studied at Phra Tamnuk Suan Kularb School until he reached the age of 17, whereupon he entered the civil service in the Ministry of Finance, later receiving the rank of Director-General in 1921, alongside being elevated to the rank of 'His Highness' (พระวรวงศ์เธอ พระองค์เจ้า) by the reigning monarch, King Rama VI. He was the only member of the House of Kashemsri with the rank 'His Serene Highness' to be elevated to 'Phra Ong Chao', or His Highness.

Following this, he became the Minister of Finance in 1922, and would continue in office until his resignation from the post in 1929. However, he resumed the position of Minister for a few short months in 1932 before the 1932 Siamese Revolution, when the new revolutionary government removed him from the position five days after the end of the absolute monarchy.

He died 6–7 months later, on 6 January 1933.

Family  
Prince Subhayok had three wives according to Siamese custom. Mom Khao, a descendant of King Taksin of Thonburi, was the most senior of the three.

 Prince Subhayok-Kasem
 Mom Khao Kashemsri Na Ayudhya (Suranandana) 
 Mom Rajawongse Prapuj Kashemsri 
 Mom Rajawongse Prapasiri Kashemsri 
 Mom Rajawongse Sasichom Kashemsri 
 Mom Rajawongse Chitin Kashemsri m. Mom Rajawongse Chalerm-Viman Devakula
 Mom Luang Chitti-Chalerm Kashemsri m. Thipa Kashemsri Na Ayudhaya (Perunavin) 
 Chitiyapa Kashemsri Na Ayudhaya m. Thawach Chatchupong 
 Phisira Chatchupong
 Rujimapas Kashemsri Na Ayudhaya m. Sumit Sara
 Supra-Kasem Kashemsri Na Ayudhaya 
 Natabhorn Kashemsri Na Ayudhaya
 Nuthaitip Kashemsri Na Ayudhaya
 Dayadhorn Kashemsri Na Ayudhaya
 Mom Rajawongse Saengsoam Kashemsri 
 Mom Nuam (Sekarij) 
 Mom Kashemsri Subhavongse¹ (Mom Rajawongse Kachit Kashemsri) m. Mom Rajawongse Payungsak Davivongse later m. Chin Thapparangsi 
 Mom Ping (Suranandana) 
 Unnamed Male Mom Rajawongse 
 Unnamed Male Mom Rajawongse
Both of Mom Ping's children are presumed to not have survived infancy

Direct male descendants and successors highlighted in bold.

¹ In this context, Mom (หม่อม) was a feudal title granted to male Mom Rajawongse, ranking above Phra and below Phraya.

Honours 
  Order of Chula Chom Klao - 1st Class (ป.จ.)
  Order of the White Elephant - Special Class (ม.ป.ช)
  Order of the Crown of Thailand - 1st Class 
  King Rama VI Royal Cypher Medal
  King Rama VII Royal Cypher Medal

Ancestry

References

Citations

Bibliography  

 

 

Thai male Phra Ong Chao
Ministers of Finance of Thailand
Kashemsri family
1872 births
1933 deaths
Thai male Mom Chao
19th-century Chakri dynasty
20th-century Chakri dynasty